Bedourie is a town and a locality in the Shire of Diamantina, Queensland, Australia.

Geography 

Bedourie is located in the Channel Country of Central West Queensland, Australia, lying on Eyre Creek.

Bedourie is the administrative centre of the Diamantina Shire, which also comprises the towns of Birdsville and Betoota.

When the Georgina River experiences severe floods the town can be cut off by road for months at a time.

Bedourie has the following mountains:

 Black Hill 
 Mount Cuttiguree 
 Mount Prout 
 Mount Tarley 
 Mount Woneeala 
 Pampra Hill 
 The Brothers 
 The Sisters

History 
The area around Bedourie is on Karanja land.

In 1886, the Diamantina local government division was established. The Royal Hotel opened in 1886 with a thatched roof (later replaced with corrugated iron).

Bedourie Post Office opened around July 1903 (receiving offices known as Bidouri, Bedouri and Bedourie had been open since 1887).

The Diamantina Shire Council moved its headquarters from Birdsville to Bedourie in 1953.

Bedourie State School opened on 16 May 1960. The current school building opened in 1967.

Twenty years earlier the town had 60 residents.

The Bedourie Public Library had a major refurbishment in 2009.

Heritage listings 

There are a number of heritage-listed sites in Bedourie, including:

 Kidman's Tree of Knowledge at Glengyle Station
 Bedourie Pisé House, 5 Herbert Street

Education 

Bedourie State School is a government primary (Early Childhood-6) school for boys and girls at 3 Timor Street.  In 2017, the school had an enrolment of 8 students with 2 teachers and 3 non-teaching staff (1 full-time equivalent). In 2018, the school had an enrolment of 7 students with 2 teachers and 5 non-teaching staff (2 full-time equivalent).

There are no secondary schools in Bedourie or nearby. The options are distance education and boarding school.

Amenities 

Bedourie has an aquatic centre, museum, outback golf course, visitor information centre, and a racetrack.

The Royal Hotel was built from adobe bricks in the 1880s.

The Diamantina Shire Council operates the Bedourie Library on 13 Herbert Street.

The Simpson Desert Roadhouse provides petrol and automotive services, accommodation, general supplies, accommodation, restaurant and bar.

Attractions 
The Bedourie Camel Races are held annually in July. The event is coordinated by the Bedourie Golf and Leisure Club and is a major tourist event for the region. As well as camel racing, the event hosts pig races, live music and entertainment and a camp oven cook off.

Climate 

Bedourie experiences a  hot desert climate (Köppen: BWh, Trewartha: BWhl); with very hot summers with occasional rains; warm to hot, dry springs and autumns; and mild, dry winters.

See also

 Bedourie Airport
 Bedourie oven

References

External links

 
Towns in Queensland
Shire of Diamantina
Localities in Queensland